The Nail may refer to:

 JLA: The Nail series, a comic book mini-series published by DC Comics
 The Nail: The Story of Joey Nardone, a 2009 drama film
 The Nail (challenge), a standing high jump challenge at the Corner Club tavern in Moscow, Idaho
 The Nail (film), a 1944 Spanish romance drama film

See also 
 Nail (disambiguation)